You Gotta See This is an American reality television series produced by Comcast Entertainment Group for Nickelodeon. The series premiered on July 21, 2012. It was hosted by Noah Crawford and Chris O'Neal.

Synopsis 
Nickelodeon describes the series as combining "the best of the web, behind-the-scenes footage, celebrity interviews, pranks, bloopers" and as a 30-minute series that "rolls all the must-see clips of the week into one hilarious package".

Production 
A 20-episode season of You Gotta See This was ordered by Nickelodeon in 2012, with production underway by summer 2012. The series was cancelled by Nickelodeon after one season.

Episodes

Broadcast 
You Gotta See This premiered on Nickelodeon on July 21, 2012. Eight episodes of the series aired before it was pulled from the network. On April 1, 2014, four episodes of the series made their U.S. debut on Nicktoons. Eight episodes were never aired in the U.S.

The series premiered on Nickelodeon Canada, Nickelodeon (Philippines) and Nickelodeon U.K. and Ireland and Nickelodeon Southeast Asia in January 2013, and on Nickelodeon (Australia) in February 2013. In May 2013, these countries began to air the remaining episodes that hadn't been aired in the United States at the time.

In June 2013, Nickelodeon confirmed that You Gotta See This would premiere on Nickelodeon Brazil and Nickelodeon Latin America on July 5, 2013.

References

2012 American television series debuts
2014 American television series endings
2010s American reality television series
2010s Nickelodeon original programming
American children's reality television series
English-language television shows
Television series by Universal Television